Table tennis was contested at the 1990 Asian Games in Workers Indoor Arena, Beijing, China from September 24 to October 1, 1990.

Table tennis had team, doubles and singles events for men and women, as well as a mixed doubles competition.

Medalists

Medal table

References

 ITTF Database

External links
OCA official website

 
1990 Asian Games events
1990
Asian Games
1990 Asian Games